is a Japanese footballer who plays for Grasshopper Club Zürich.

Career
Seko joined Cerezo Osaka in 2016. On 13 November, he debuted for their U-23 squad in J3 League (v Kataller Toyama). He gave his J1 League debut for the main squad on 7 December 2019, in 2-0 victory over Ōita.

He signed a three year contract with Swiss Super League team Grasshopper Club Zürich on 18 January 2022.

He was called up to give his debut for the Japan national team in a friendly against Uzbekistan on 21 January 2022. However, the match was cancelled by the JFA due to COVID restrictions.

Honors
Individual
J.League Rookie of the Year: 2020
J.League Cup New Hero Award: 2020

References

External links

 

2000 births
Living people
Association football people from Osaka Prefecture
Japanese footballers
Japan youth international footballers
Association football defenders
Cerezo Osaka players
Cerezo Osaka U-23 players
Grasshopper Club Zürich players
J2 League players
J3 League players
Footballers at the 2020 Summer Olympics
Olympic footballers of Japan
Japanese expatriate footballers
Expatriate footballers in Switzerland
Japanese expatriate sportspeople in Switzerland
Japan under-20 international footballers